Ciudad Expo is one of the two end point stations of Seville Metro on the line 1. It will also be a tram stop of the Aljarafe tram line. Ciudad Expo is a ground station located in the avenue of Los Descubrimientos in the municipality of Mairena del Aljarafe. It was opened on 2 April 2009.

Connections
Bus: M-101, M-150, M-151, M-152, M-153, M-155 Tram: Aljarafe tram

See also
 List of Seville metro stations

References

External links
  Official site.
 History, construction details and maps.

Seville Metro stations
Railway stations in Spain opened in 2009